Canville or de Canville may refer to:

Canville Creek, a river in Kansas
Canville Township, Neosho County, Kansas
Gerard de Canville (also written Camville; died 1214), Anglo-Norman landowner and administrator in England
Thomas de Canville (also written Camville; died 1234), Anglo-Norman landowner and judge in England

See also
Canville-la-Rocque
Canville-les-Deux-Églises
Baron Camville
Richard de Camville
Clifton Campville